Paint is a pigmented liquid or paste used to apply color to a surface, often by artists.

Paint or Painted may also refer to:

Places 
Paint, Pennsylvania, a borough
Paint Township (disambiguation), various townships in Ohio and Pennsylvania
Paint River, Michigan
Paint Creek (disambiguation), numerous streams in the U.S.
Paint Branch, a stream in Maryland

Art and entertainment 
 Paint (1991 film), a British television film by Kathy Page in the anthology series ScreenPlay
 Paint (2023 film), an American drama film starring Owen Wilson
Paint (band), a Canadian indie rock group based in Toronto
Paint, a BBC Two ident
"Paint", a song by Roxette from Look Sharp!
Paint (album), a 2017 album by Australian band Holy Holy
Paint, onscreen alias of YouTuber Jon Cozart
Painted (Narrows album), 2012
Painted (Lucky Daye album)
"Painted" (song), 2015 song by MS MR

Technology 
Microsoft Paint, a simple graphics painting program
GNU Paint, a free and open source raster graphics editor similar to Microsoft Paint
Paint.NET, proprietary freeware raster graphics editor program for Microsoft Windows
PCPaint, an early DOS-based graphics program
MacPaint, an early Macintosh graphics program

Sports
Paint (basketball) or key, area on basketball court
Chillicothe Paints, American baseball team

Other 
Henry Nicholas Paint (1830–1921), Canadian politician, shipowner and merchant
American Paint Horse, a breed

See also
Painting
Painter (disambiguation)
Painting (disambiguation)